The 2019  Copa Federación de España is the 27th edition of the Copa Federación de España, also known as Copa RFEF, a knockout competition for Spanish football clubs in Segunda División B and Tercera División.

The competition began in late July with the first games of the Regional stages and will end in November 2019 with the national final. As part of the new competition format, the four semifinalists will join the 2019–20 Copa del Rey first round.

Regional tournaments

West Andalusia and Ceuta tournament
Utrera was the only registered team and qualified directly for national phase.

East Andalusia and Melilla tournament
Vélez was the only registered team and qualified directly for national phase.

Aragon tournament
Eight teams joined the tournament in the 2019–20 edition.

Group 1

Group 2

Final

Asturias tournament
For this edition, reserve teams were excluded. This decision affected to Sporting Gijón B, Oviedo B and Praviano, that since this season acted as Oviedo's second reserve team.

Groups were drawn on 23 July in a competition where format changed as all the knockout stage will be played at Estadio Santa Cruz, in Gijón.

Group stage

Group A

Group B

Group C

Group D

Knockout stage

Final

Balearic Islands tournament
Only Ibiza Islas Pitiusas and Poblense joined the tournament.

Final

Basque Country tournament

Canary Islands tournament
Unión Viera was the only registered team and qualified directly for national phase.

Cantabria tournament
Teams qualified between second and ninth place in 2017–18 Tercera División Group 3 registered for playing the competition, except Racing Santander B as reserve team. The bracket was drawn on 4 July. Quarter-finals and Semi-finals were played in Santa Cruz de Bezana.

Final

Castile-La Mancha tournament
The Castile-La Mancha Football Federation announced the XVIII Torneo Junta de Comunidades de Castilla La Mancha as the regional Copa RFEF qualifying tournament.

Final

Castile and León tournament
Only Arandina and Real Burgos joined the tournament.

Final

Catalonia tournament
Only Prat and Vilafranca joined the tournament.

Final

Extremadura tournament
17 teams joined the tournament, consisting in a single-game knockout tournament. The preliminary round and the round of 16 were firstly drawn, and later each round was drawn independently.

Final

Galicia tournament
For this edition, reserve teams were excluded and the winner will receive a price of €3,005.

Final

La Rioja tournament
Six teams joined the tournament.

Final

Madrid tournament
Only Móstoles URJC and Navalcarnero joined the tournament.

Final

Murcia tournament
6 teams joined the tournament. Two groups of three teams were established at two different locations, in the Gómez Meseguer field in Cartagena and in the Los Garres field in Murcia. Each match will last 45 minutes. The champions of each group qualifies to the final.

Group 1

Group 2

Final

Navarre tournament
Only Cortes and Huarte joined the tournament.

Final

Valencian Community tournament
6 teams joined the tournament. Tournament will be played in three stages, the first with two groups of three teams, second with the semifinals being the group winners the local team and third the final in a neutral venue.

Group 1

Group 2

Olímpic fielded ineligible players and was sanctioned by FFCV, which resulted in the awarding of 3–0 wins for Jove Español and Novelda. Olímpic had won 2–1 the two matches.

Knockout stage

Final

National phase
National phase was played between October and December with 32 teams (18 winners of the Regional Tournaments and 14 teams of Segunda División B). The four semifinalists qualified to 2019–20 Copa del Rey first round.

Qualified teams

Best 14 qualified non-reserve teams from 2018–19 Segunda División B not qualified to 2019–20 Copa del Rey
 Alcoyano (4)
 Burgos (3)
 Calahorra (3)
 Castellón (3)
 Coruxo (3)
 Internacional (3)
  Izarra (3)
 Linense (3)
 Murcia (3)
 Sabadell (3)
 Salamanca UDS (3)
 San Fernando (3)
 Talavera de la Reina (3)
 Tudelano (3)

Winners of Autonomous Communities tournaments
 Arandina (4)
 Arroyo (4)
  Compostela (4)
 Conquense (4)
 Cortes (4)
 Cultural Durango (4)
 Jove Español (4)
 Llanes (4)
 Móstoles URJC (4)
 Muleño (4)
 Náxara (4)
 Poblense (4)
 Prat (3)
 Teruel (4)
 Tropezón (4)
 Unión Viera (4)
 Utrera (4)
 Vélez (4)

Draw
The draw of all the tournament was held at the headquarters of the RFEF on 20 September. Teams were divided in four pots according to geographical criteria. Each pot will play independently until semifinals:

Round of 32

Round of 16

Quarter-finals
Winners will qualify to 2019–20 Copa del Rey first round.

Semi-finals

Final

References

External links
Royal Spanish Football Federation 

2019-20
3
2019–20 Segunda División B
2019–20 Tercera División